Tom Stanley Smith (9 March 1911 – 1986) was an English footballer who played as a full back for Rochdale and Luton Town, as well as non league football for various other clubs.

References 

English footballers
Rushden & Higham United F.C. players
Nelson F.C. players
Rochdale A.F.C. players
Luton Town F.C. players
Burnley F.C. players
1911 births
1986 deaths